Epilacydes is a genus of tiger moths in the family Erebidae erected by Arthur Gardiner Butler in 1875. The moths are found in the Afrotropics.

Species 
 Epilacydes bayoni (Berio, 1935)
 Epilacydes pseudoscita Dubatolov, 2006
 Epilacydes scita (Walker, [1865])
 Epilacydes simulans Butler, 1875
 Epilacydes unilinea (Rothschild, 1910)

References

 , 2006: New genera and species of Arctiinae from the Afrotropical fauna (Lepidoptera: Arctiidae). Nachrichten des Entomologische Vereins Apollo 27 (3): 139–152.

External links

Spilosomina
Moth genera